Gomphotherium ("welded beast") is an extinct genus of gomphothere proboscidean from the Neogene of Eurasia, Africa and North America. The genus is probably paraphyletic.

Description

Gomphotherium, like most primitive proboscideans, had an elongated lower jaw which bore tusks.

Ecology 
Most species of Gomphotherium are inferred to have been browsers or mixed feeders, but specimens of G. steinheimense from China are suggested to have been grazers.

Evolution 
The oldest remains of Gomphotherium are known from Africa, dating to approximately 19.5 million years ago. Gomphotherium migrated into Eurasia across the "Gomphotherium land bridge" approximately 18 million years ago. Gomphotherium has been posited to be the ancestor of later gomphothere genera, including the "tetralophodont gomphotheres", which are probably ancestral to stegodontids and elephantids. Gomphotherium first arrived in North America during the mid-Miocene, approximately 15 million years ago, and is suggested to be ancestral to later New World gomphothere genera, such as Cuvieronius, Stegomastodon and Rhynchotherium, with Gomphotherium itself disappearing from North America at the beginning of the Pliocene, approximately 5 million years ago.

Taxonomy
The following cladogram shows the placement of the genus Gomphotherium among other proboscideans, based on hyoid characteristics:

Species 
Over a dozen species of Gomphotherium are considered valid, with over 30 junior synonyms proposed for these taxa.

 G. hannibali Welcomme, 1994 Europe, Early Miocene
 G. annectens (Matsumoto, 1925) Japan, Early Miocene
 G. cooperi (Osborn, 1932) Asia, Early Miocene
 G. sylvaticum Tassy, 1985 Europe, Early Miocene
 G. libycum (Fourtau, 1918) Egypt, Early Miocene
 G. inopinatum (Borissiak and Belyaeva, 1928) China, late Early Miocene-Early middle Miocene
 G. mongoliense (Osborn, 1924) Mongolia, late Early Miocene-Early middle Miocene
 G. connexum Hopwood, 1935 China, late Early Miocene-Early middle Miocene
 G. angustidens (Cuvier, 1817) (type) Europe, Middle Miocene
 G. subtapiroideum (Schlesinger, 1917) Europe, Early-Middle Miocene
 G. tassyi Wang, Li, Duangkrayom, Yang, He & Chen, 2017 China, Middle Miocene
 G. wimani Hopwood, 1935 China, Middle Miocene
 G. browni (Osborn, 1926) Pakistan, Middle Miocene
 G. steinheimense (Klahn, 1922) Europe, China, Middle-Late Miocene
 G. productum (Cope, 1874) North America Middle Miocene-Early Pliocene

Phylogeny after Wang et al. 2017

References 

Cenozoic mammals of Europe
Gomphotheres
Miocene proboscideans
Pliocene proboscideans
Zanclean extinctions
Cenozoic mammals of North America
White River Fauna
Prehistoric placental genera
Fossil taxa described in 1837